Edward Frederic Benson  (24 July 1867 – 29 February 1940) was an English novelist, biographer, memoirist, archaeologist and short story writer.

Early life

E.F. Benson was born at Wellington College in Berkshire, the fifth child of the headmaster, Edward White Benson (later chancellor of Lincoln Cathedral, Bishop of Truro and Archbishop of Canterbury), and his wife born Mary Sidgwick ("Minnie").

E.F. Benson was the younger brother of Arthur Christopher Benson, who wrote the words to "Land of Hope and Glory", Robert Hugh Benson, author of several novels and Roman Catholic apologetic works, and Margaret Benson (Maggie), an author and amateur Egyptologist. Two other siblings died young. Benson's parents had six children and no grandchildren.

Benson was educated at Temple Grove School, then at Marlborough College, where he wrote some of his earliest works and upon which he based his novel David Blaize. He continued his education at King's College, Cambridge. At Cambridge, he was a member of the Pitt Club, and later in life he became an honorary fellow of Magdalene College.

Works

Benson's first book published was Sketches from Marlborough. He started his novel-writing career with the (then) fashionably controversial Dodo (1893), which was an instant success, and followed it with a variety of satire and romantic and supernatural melodrama. He repeated the success of Dodo, which featured a scathing description of composer and militant suffragette Ethel Smyth (which she "gleefully acknowledged", according to actress Prunella Scales), with the same cast of characters a generation later: Dodo the Second (1914), "a unique chronicle of the pre-1914 Bright Young Things" and Dodo Wonders (1921), "a first-hand social history of the Great War in Mayfair and the Shires".

The Mapp and Lucia series, written relatively late in his career, consists of six novels and two short stories. The novels are: Queen Lucia, Miss Mapp, Lucia in London, Mapp and Lucia, Lucia's Progress (published as The Worshipful Lucia in the United States) and Trouble for Lucia. The short stories are "The Male Impersonator" and "Desirable Residences". Both appear in anthologies of Benson's short stories, and the former is also often appended to the end of the novel Miss Mapp.

In February 1983 BBC Radio 4 broadcast Trouble for Lucia – a 12-part adaptation by Aubrey Woods of the first four novels. In April and May 2007 BBC Radio 4 broadcast Mapp and Lucia – a 10-part adaptation by Ned Sherrin. In 2008 BBC Radio 4 broadcast Lucia's Progress – a five-part dramatisation by John Peacock of the fifth novel.

The last three novels were dramatised by Gerald Savory for a 10-episode TV series produced by London Weekend Television and broadcast in two five-part runs between 1985 and 1986 on the then recently launched Channel 4. Titled Mapp and Lucia, the series featured Geraldine McEwan as Lucia, Prunella Scales as Mapp and Nigel Hawthorne as Georgie. In 2007 the British channel ITV3 broadcast the 1985–1986 series. A three-part dramatisation by Steve Pemberton – starring Miranda Richardson as Mapp, Anna Chancellor as Lucia and Steve Pemberton as Georgie – was broadcast on BBC One over consecutive evenings between 29 and 31 December 2014.

Benson was also known as a writer of atmospheric and at times humorous or satirical ghost stories, which often were published in story magazines such as Pearson's Magazine or Hutchinson's Magazine, 20 of which were illustrated by Edmund Blampied. These "spook stories", as they were termed, were reprinted in collections by his principal publisher Walter Hutchinson. His 1906 short story "The Bus-Conductor", a fatal-crash premonition tale about a person haunted by a hearse driver, has been adapted several times, notably during 1944 (for the film Dead of Night and as an anecdote in Bennett Cerf's Ghost Stories anthology published the same year) and for a 1961 episode of The Twilight Zone. The catchphrase from the story, "Room for one more", created a legend, and also occurs in the 1986 Oingo Boingo song "Dead Man's Party".

Benson's story David Blaize and the Blue Door (1918) is a children's fantasy influenced by the work of Lewis Carroll. "Mr Tilly's Seance" is a witty and amusing story about a man flattened by a traction-engine who finds himself dead and conscious on the 'other side'. Other notable stories are the eerie "The Room in the Tower" and "Pirates".

Benson is known for a series of biographies/autobiographies and memoirs, including one of Charlotte Brontë. His last book, delivered to his publisher 10 days before his death, was an autobiography titled Final Edition.

H.P. Lovecraft spoke well of Benson's works in his essay "Supernatural Horror in Literature", most notably of his story "The Man Who Went Too Far".

Further "Mapp and Lucia" books have been written by Tom Holt, Guy Fraser-Sampson, and Ian Shepherd.

Links to Rye, East Sussex

The principal setting of four of the Mapp and Lucia books is a town named Tilling, which is recognizably based on Rye, East Sussex, where Benson lived for many years and served as mayor from 1934 (he relocated there in 1918). Benson's home, Lamb House, served as the model for Mallards, Mapp's – and ultimately Lucia's – home in some of the Tilling series. There really was a handsome "Garden Room" adjoining the street but it was destroyed by a bomb during the Second World War. Lamb House attracted writers: it was earlier the home of Henry James, and later of Rumer Godden.

He donated a church window of the main parish church in Rye, St Mary's, in memory of his brother, as well as providing a gift of a viewing platform overlooking the Town Salts.

Personal life
Benson was gay, but was intensely discreet. At Cambridge, he fell in love with several fellow students, including Vincent Yorke (father of the novelist Henry Yorke), about whom he confided to his diary, "I feel perfectly mad about him just now... Ah, if only he knew, and yet I think he does." In later life, Benson maintained friendships with a wide circle of gay men and shared a villa on the Italian island of Capri with John Ellingham Brooks; before the First World War, the island had been popular with wealthy gay men.

Homoeroticism and a general homosexual sensibility suffuses his literary works, such as David Blaize (1916), and his most popular works are famed for their wry and dry camp humour and social observations.

Benson was a good athlete, and represented England at figure skating. He was a precocious and prolific writer, publishing his first book while still a student.

In London, Benson also lived at 395 Oxford Street, W1 (now a branch of Russell & Bromley just west of Bond Street Underground Station), 102 Oakley Street, SW3, and 25 Brompton Square, SW3, where much of the action of Lucia in London occurs and where English Heritage placed a Blue Plaque during 1994.

Death
Benson died during 1940 of throat cancer at the University College Hospital, London. He is buried in the cemetery at Rye, East Sussex.

Bibliography

Novels

Dodo trilogy:
 Dodo: A Detail of the Day (1893)
 Dodo's Daughter (1913; published in the UK [1914] as Dodo the Second)
 Dodo Wonders (1921)

David Blaize series:
 David Blaize (1916)
 David Blaize and the Blue Door (1918)
 David of King's (1924; published in the United States as David Blaize of King's)

Mapp and Lucia series:
 Queen Lucia (1920)
 Miss Mapp (1922 [UK]; published in the United States 1923)
 Lucia in London (1927 [UK]; published in the United States 1928)
 Mapp and Lucia (1931)
 Lucia's Progress (1935; published in the United States as The Worshipful Lucia)
 Trouble for Lucia (1939)

Colin series:
 Colin: A Novel (1923)
 Colin II (1925)

Stand-alones:

 The Rubicon (novel)|The Rubicon (1894)
 The Judgement Books (novella, 1895)
 Limitations (Benson novel) (1896)
 The Babe, B.A. (1897)
 The Money Market (1898)
 The Vintage (novel) (1898)
 The Capsina (1899)
 Mammon and Co. (1899)
 The Princess Sophia (1900)
 The Luck of the Vails  (1901)
 Scarlet and Hyssop (1902)
 An Act in a Backwater (1903)
 The Book of Months (1903)
  (1903)
 The Valkyries (1903)
 The Challoners (1904)
 The Angel of Pain (1905 [USA]; published in the UK 1906)
 The Image in the Sand (1905)
 The House of Defence (1906)
 Paul (1906)
 Sheaves (1907)
 The Blotting Book  (1908)
  (1908)
 A Reaping (1909)
 Daisy's Aunt (1910; published in the United States [1910] as The Fascinating Mrs. Halton)
 Margery (1910; published in the UK [1911] as Juggernaut)
 The Osbornes (1910)
 Account Rendered (1911)
 Mrs. Ames (1912)
 Thorley Weir (1913)
 The Weaker Vessel (1913)
 Arundel (1914)
 The Oakleyites (1915)
 Mike (1916 [UK]; published in the United States as Michael)
 The Freaks of Mayfair (1916; sketches)
 An Autumn Sowing (1917)
 Mr. Teddy (1917 [UK]; published in the United States as The Tortoise)
 Up and Down (1918)
  (1919)
 Robin Linnet (1919)
 Lovers and Friends (1921)
 Peter (1922)
 Alan (1924)
 Rex (1925)
 Mezzanine (1926)
 Pharisees and Publicans (1926)
 Paying Guests (1929)
 The Inheritor (1930)
 Secret Lives (1932)
 As We Are, A Modern Revue (1932)
 Travail of Gold (1933)
 Ravens' Brood (1934)

Short stories

Collections:
 Six Common Things (1893 [UK]; published in the United States as A Double Overture 1894), collection of 16 short stories:
 "Once", "Autumn and Love", "Two Days After", "Carrington", "Jack and Poll", "At King's Cross Station", "The Sound of the Grinding", "Blue Stripe", "A Winter Morning", "The Zoo", "The Three Old Ladies", "Like a Grammarian", "Poor Miss Huntingford", "The Defeat of Lady Grantham.", "The Tragedy of a Green Totem", "The Death Warrant"
 The Room in the Tower, and Other Stories (1912), collection of 16 short stories and 1 novelette:
 "The Room in the Tower", "The Dust-Cloud", "Gavon's Eve", "The Confession of Charles Linkworth", "At Abdul Ali's Grave", "The Shootings of Achnaleish", "How Fear Departed from the Long Gallery", "Caterpillars", "The Cat", "The Bus-Conductor", "The Man Who Went Too Far" (novelette), "Between the Lights", "Outside the Door", "The Terror by Night", "The Other Bed", "The Thing in the Hall", "The House with the Brick-Kiln"
 The Countess of Lowndes Square, and Other Stories (1920), collection of 14 short stories:
 "The Countess of Lowndes Square", "The Blackmailer of Park Lane", "The Dance on the Beefsteak", "The Oriolists", "In the Dark", "The False Step", "The Case of Frank Hampden", "Mrs. Andrews's Control", "The Ape", "Through", "Puss-Cat", "There Arose a King", "Tragedy of Oliver Bowman", "Philip's Safety Razor"
 "And the Dead Spake—", and The Horror Horn (1923), collection of 2 short stories:
 "The Horror-Horn", "And the Dead Spake..."
 Visible and Invisible (1923 [UK]; published in the United States 1924), collection of 12 short stories:
 "And the Dead Spake...", "The Outcast", "The Horror-Horn", "Machaon", "Negotium Perambulans", "At the Farmhouse", "Inscrutable Decrees", "The Gardener", "Mr. Tilly's Séance", "Mrs. Amworth", "In the Tube", "Roderick's Story"
 Spook Stories (1928), collection of 12 short stories:
 "Reconciliation", "The Face", "Spinach", "Bagnell Terrace", "A Tale of an Empty House", "Naboth's Vineyard", "Expiation", "Home, Sweet Home", "And No Bird Sings", "The Corner House", "Corstophine", "The Temple"
 More Spook Stories (1934), collection of 13 short stories:
 "The Step", "The Bed by the Window", "James Lamp", "The Dance", "The Hanging of Alfred Wadham", "Pirates", "The Wishing-Well", "The Bath-Chair", "Monkeys", "Christopher Comes Back", "The Sanctuary", "Thursday Evenings", "The Psychical Mallards"
 Old London (1937), collection of 4 novellas:
 "Portrait of an English Nobleman", "Janet", "Friend of the Rich", "The Unwanted"
 The Horror Horn and Other Stories: The Best Horror Stories of E. F. Benson (1974), collection of 13 short stories:
 "The Sanctuary", "Monkeys", "The Bed by the Window", "And No Bird Sings", "The Face", "Mrs. Amworth", "Negotium Perambulans", "The Horror-Horn", "The House with the Brick-Kiln", "The Thing in the Hall", "Caterpillars", "Gavon's Eve", "The Room in the Tower"
 The Tale of an Empty House and Other Ghost Stories (1986), collection of 14 short stories:
 "The Face", "Caterpillars", "Expiation", "The Tale of an Empty House", "The Bus-Conductor", "How Fear Departed from the Long Gallery", "The Other Bed", "The Room in the Tower", "Mrs. Amworth", "And No Bird Sings", "Mr. Tilly's Séance", "Home, Sweet Home", "The Sanctuary", "Pirates"
 The Flint Knife (Equation, 1988), edited by Jack Adrian, collection of 15 short stories (12 previously uncollected and 3 previously collected in The Countess of Lowndes Square):
 "The Flint Knife", "The Chippendale Mirror", "The Witch-Ball", "The Ape", "Sir Roger de Coverley", "The China Bowl", "The Passenger", "The Friend in the Garden", "The Red House", "Through", "The Box at the Bank", "The Light in the Garden", "Dummy on a Dahabeah", "The Return of Frank Hampden", "The Shuttered Room"
 Desirable Residences and Other Stories (1991), edited by Jack Adrian, collection of 6 short stories:
 "The Superannuation Department AD 1945", "The Satyr's Sandals", "The Disappearance of Jacob Conifer", "Number 12", "The Top Landing", "Sea Mist"
 The Collected Ghost Stories of E.F. Benson (Carroll & Graf, 1992), edited by Richard Dalby, omnibus ed of collections The Room in the Tower, and Other Stories, Visible and Invisible, Spook Stories and More Spook Stories, with the addition of an essay on "The Clonmel Witch Burning"; Despite its title, the collection does not include any of the stories collected in The Flint Knife.
 Fine Feathers and Other Stories (Oxford University Press, 1994), edited by Jack Adrian, collection of 31 short stories:
 The three Spook stories printed here do not appear in The Flint Knife or The Collected Ghost Stories:
 The Further Diversions of Amy Bondham: "The Lovers", "Complete Rest", "The Five Foolish Virgins"
 Crook stories: "My Friend the Murderer", "Professor Burnaby's Discovery"
 Sardonic stories: "The Exposure of Pamela", "Miss Maria's Romance", "The Eavesdropper", "James Sutherland, Ltd", "Bootles", "Julian's Cottage"
 Society stories: "Fine Feathers", "The Defeat of Lady Hartridge", "The Jamboree", "Complementary Souls", "Dodo and the Brick", "A Comedy of Styles", "Noblesse Oblige", "An Entire Mistake", "Mr Carew's Game of Croquet", "The Fall of Augusta", "The Male Impersonator"
 Crank stories: "M. O. M.", "The Adventure of Hegel Junior", "The Simple Life", "Mrs Andrews's Control", "George's Secret", "Buntingford Jugs"
 Spook stories: "By the sluice", "Atmospherics", "Boxing Night"
 The Collected Spook Stories series (Ash-Tree Press), collects all of E. F. Benson's supernatural fiction.
 Vol. 1: The Terror by Night (1998), collection of 14 short stories and 1 novelette:
 "At Abdul Ali's Grave", "The Man Who Went Too Far" (novelette), "The Cat", "The Dust-Cloud", "Gavon's Eve", "The Shootings of Achnaleish", "The Bus-Conductor", "The Terror by Night", "The House with the Brick-Kiln", "Between the Lights", "Caterpillars", "Outside the Door", "The Thing in the Hall", "The Other Bed", "How Fear Departed from the Long Gallery"
 Vol. 2: The Passenger (1999), collection of 14 short stories:
 "The Room in the Tower", "The Confession of Charles Linkworth", "The Friend in the Garden", "Dummy on a Dahabeah", "The Red House", "The Chippendale Mirror", "The Return of Frank Hampden", "The China Bowl", "The Passenger", "The Ape", "Through", "Thursday Evenings", "The Light in the Garden", "The Psychical Mallards"
 Vol. 3: Mrs Amworth (2001), collection of 16 short stories:
 "The Outcast", "Number 12", "Mrs. Amworth", "The Top Landing", "The Gardener", "The Horror-Horn", "And the Dead Spake...", "Negotium Perambulans...", "In the Tube", "Machaon", "Mr. Tilly's Séance", "At the Farmhouse", "Inscrutable Decrees", "Roderick's Story", "Expiation", "Boxing Night"
 Vol. 4: The Face (2003), collection of 15 short stories:
 "Naboth's Vineyard", "The Face", "Spinach", "Reconciliation", "Corstophine", "The Temple", "A Tale of an Empty House", "Bagnell Terrace", "The Corner House", "And No Bird Sings", "The Call", "The Bath-Chair", "The Dance", "Home, Sweet Home", "By the Sluice"
 Vol. 5: Sea Mist (2005), collection of 20 short stories:
 "Dives and Lazarus", "Sir Roger de Coverley", "The Box at the Bank", "Pirates", "The Witch-Ball", "The Hanging of Alfred Wadham", "Atmospherics", "The Wishing-Well", "Christopher Comes Back", "The Bed by the Window", "The Shuttered Room", "The Flint Knife", "James Lamp", "The Step", "The Sanctuary", "Monkeys", "Sea Mist", "Mrs. Andrews's Control", "The Clandon Crystal", "The Everlasting Silence"
 Night Terrors: The Ghost Stories of E. F. Benson (Wordsworth, 2012), edited by David Stuart Davies; Effectively a reprint of Richard Dalby's 1992 Collected Ghost Stories of E. F. Benson, since it is an omnibus ed of The Room in the Tower, and Other Stories, Visible and Invisible, Spook Stories and More Spook Stories; It omits the essay on 'The Clonmel Witch Burning" and substitutes an introduction by Davies for that by Dalby.
 The E. F. Benson Megapack (2013), collection of 35 short stories and 1 novelette:
 "At Abdul Ali's Grave", "The Man Who Went Too Far" (novelette), "The Cat", "Gavon's Eve", "The Dust-Cloud", "The Shootings at Achnaleish", "The Bus-Conductor", "The House with the Brick-Kiln", "Outside the Door", "How Fear Departed from the Long Gallery", "The Confession of Charles Linkworth", "The Room in the Tower", "Caterpillars", "Between the Lights", "The Terror by Night", "The Other Bed", "The China Bowl", "The Passenger", "The Ape", "Through", "Thursday Evenings", "The Psychical Mallards", "Mrs Amworth", "The Gardener", "The Horror-Horn", "And the Dead Spake...", "Negotium Perambulans", "In the Tube", "Mr. Tilly's Séance", "The Case of Frank Hampden", "Mrs. Andrews's Control", "The Death Warrant", "Machaon", "At the Farmhouse", "Inscrutable Decrees", "The Thing in the Hall"
 Ghost Stories (2016), collection of 8 short stories and 1 novelette:
 "Spinach", "In the Tube", "The Man Who Went Too Far" (novelette), "Mrs Amworth", "The Room in the Tower", "The Bus-Conductor", "Negotium Perambulans", "And No Bird Sings", "Caterpillars"
 The Outcast and Other Dark Tales (2020), collection of 16 short stories:
 "Dummy on a Dahabeah", "A Winter Morning", "The Thing in the Hall", "The Passenger", "The Light in the Garden", "The Outcast", "The Top Landing", "The Face", "The Corner House", "By the Sluice", "Pirates", "The Secret Garden", "The Flint Knife", "The Bath-Chair", "The Dance", "Billy Comes Through"

Uncollected short stories:
 "The Mystery of Black Rock Creek" (1894), with Jerome K. Jerome, Frank Frankfort Moore, Barry Pain and Eden Phillpotts
 "The Adventure of Hegel", Illustrated London News, January 1901
 "The Hapless Bachelors" (1921)
 "The Witch Ball", Woman's Journal, December 1928
 "The Woman in the Veil" (1928)
 "Dark and Nameless" (1929)

Plays
 Aunt Jeannie (1902; unpublished)
 Dodo (1905; unpublished)
 The Friend in the Garden (1906; unpublished)
 Dinner for Eight (1915; unpublished)
 The Luck of the Vails (1928; unpublished)

Non-fiction

Articles (selected)
 "A Question of Taste,", The Nineteenth Century, Volume 34, July/December 1893
 "The Recent 'Witch Burning' at Clonmel", or "The Clonmel Witch Burning" (1895)
 "A House of Help", Londonderry Sentinel, 11 November 1924
 "The Way Out", Falkirk Herald, 7 May 1927. Reprinted: Mansfield Reporter, 3 June 1927; Gazette, 6 July 1927
 "The Athletic Ideal", Buckingham Advertiser & Free Press, 25 August 1928. Reprinted: Worthing Gazette, 29 August 1928; Littlehampton Gazette, 31 August 1928
 "The Grave-Diggers", Todmorden & District News, 10 January 1930
 Sheridan LeFanu, 1931, republished in Reflections in a Glass Darkly: Essays on J. Sheridan LeFanu, 2011
 "Men and Bees", Middlesex County Times, 26 March 1932. Reprinted: Long Eaton Advertiser, 1 April 1932
 "Our Hard-working Royal Family", Yorkshire Evening Post, 29 November 1934
 The King and His Reign, a series of twelve articles published in The Spectator between 22 February and 9 May 1935, to commemorate the silver jubilee of King George V

Autobiographies
 Our Family Affairs, 1867–1896 (1920 [UK]; published in the United States 1921)
 Mother (1925)
 Final Edition: Informal Autobiography (1940)

Biographies
 Sir Francis Drake (1927)
 The Life of Alcibiades (1928)
 As We Were: A Victorian Peepshow, or As We Are (1930)
 Ferdinand Magellan (1929 [UK]; published in the United States 1930)
 Charlotte Brontë (1932)
 King Edward VII (1933)
 Queen Victoria (1935)
 Charlotte, Anne and Emily Brontë (1936; essay)
 Queen Victoria's Daughters (1938 [USA]; published in the UK [1939] as The Daughters of Queen Victoria)

Guides
 Daily Training (1902), with Eustace Miles
 Diversions Day by Day (1905), with Eustace Miles

History
 Deutschland Über Allah (1918; republished in Crescent and Iron Cross George H. Doran Company, 1918)
 Poland and Mittel-Europa (1918 [UK]; published in the United States 1919; reprinted as The White Eagle of Poland)
 The Outbreak of War, 1914 (1933 [UK]; published in the United States 1934)
 The Kaiser and English Relations (1936)

Opinion
 Thoughts from E.F. Benson [compiled by E.E. Norton] (1913)
 Thoughts from E.F. Benson [compiled by H.B. Elliott] (1917)

Pamphlets
 Notes on Excavations in Alexandrian Cemeteries [in collaboration with D.G. Hogarth] (1895)
 Two Generations (1904; published by the London Daily Mail), 10-page pamphlet
 From Abraham to Christ (1928)

Society
 The Social Value of Temperance (1919)

Sports
 A Book of Golf (1903), edited with Eustace Miles
 The Cricket of Abel, Hirst and Shrewsbury (1903), edited with Eustace Miles
 English Figure Skating (1908)
 Winter Sports in Switzerland (1913)
    
Others
 Sketches from Marlborough (1888)
 The Mad Annual (1903), with Eustace Miles
 Bensoniana (1912)

Adaptations 

 "The Hearse Driver", segment directed by Basil Dearden in film Dead of Night (1945), based on short story "The Bus-Conductor"
 "Mrs. Amworth", segment directed by Alvin Rakoff in film Three Dangerous Ladies (1977), based on short story "Mrs. Amworth"
 Mrs. Amworth (1978), TV pilot directed by Alvin Rakoff, based on short story "Mrs. Amworth"
 Mapp & Lucia (1985-1986), series directed by Donald McWhinnie, based on novels Mapp and Lucia, Lucia's Progress and Trouble for Lucia
 Mapp and Lucia (2014), miniseries directed by Diarmuid Lawrence, based on novel Mapp and Lucia, with incidents lifted from earlier novels

See also

List of horror fiction authors

References

Further reading
 
 Goldhill, Simon. A Very Queer Family Indeed: Sex, Religion, and the Bensons in Victorian Britain, University of Chicago Press, 2016. 
 Joshi, S.T. "E. F. Benson: Spooks and More Spooks" in The Evolution of the Weird Tale Hippocampus Press, 2004, 59–65. 
 Masters, Brian. The Life of E.F. Benson. Chatto & Windus, 1991.  
 Morgan, Chris, "E.F. Benson" in, E.F. Bleiler, ed. Supernatural Fiction Writers. Scribner's, 1985.  
 Palmer, Geoffrey and Lloyd, Noel. E. F. Benson As He Was, Lennard Publishing, 1988.
 Searles, A.L. "The Short fiction of Benson" in Frank N. Magill, ed. Survey of Modern Fantasy Literature, Vol 3. Salem Press, Inc., 1983.  

 Watkins, Gwen. E. F. Benson and His Family and Friends. Rye, Sussex: E. F. Benson Society, 2003.

External links

 The E.F. Benson Society
 The Friends of Tilling
 "E.F. Benson in Egypt" by William H. Peck, (c) 2009
 E F Benson – The Complete Works (blog)
 E F Benson – First Editions

Online editions
 
 
 Works by E. F. Benson at Project Gutenberg of Australia
 
 
"The Bus-Conductor", published in Pall Mall Magazine, 1906

Libraries
 "Guide to the E.F. Benson Papers" at the Beinecke Rare Book and Manuscript Library

1867 births
1940 deaths
People from Crowthorne
19th-century English LGBT people
20th-century English LGBT people
19th-century English male writers
19th-century British short story writers
19th-century English novelists
20th-century English male writers
20th-century British short story writers
20th-century English dramatists and playwrights
20th-century English historians
20th-century English memoirists
20th-century English novelists
EF
Birdwatchers
Deaths from cancer in England
Deaths from esophageal cancer
English biographers
English horror writers
English male non-fiction writers
English male novelists
English male short story writers
English short story writers
English gay writers
Ghost story writers
People educated at Marlborough College
People educated at Temple Grove School
English LGBT novelists